"Hummer" is the second single by Foals and is the first single with Yannis Philippakis on lead vocals (the previous lead vocalist was Andrew Mears). It was released on 12 March 2007. It was recorded and mixed by producer Gareth Parton at the Fortress and Metropolis recording studios, London. It was released as a digital download and on vinyl on 23 April 2007.

Although initially released as a non-album single, it was added as a bonus track to later editions of Foals' first album Antidotes.

The song was used in the second series of Skins.

Critical reception
In an 8/10 review, Drowned In Sound described the track as sounding "like Animal Collective rifling through The Rapture’s audio files on electro night". It came 12th in a top tracks of 2007 list compiled by NME. In October 2011, NME placed it at number 142 on its list of "150 Best Tracks of the Past 15 Years".

Track listing

References

2007 singles
Foals songs
2007 songs
Songs written by Yannis Philippakis
Transgressive Records singles